KGBA-FM (100.1 FM) is a radio station broadcasting a Contemporary Christian format. Licensed to Holtville, California, United States, it serves the Calexico area.  The station is currently owned by The Voice of International Christian Evangelism, Inc. and features programming from Salem Communications.

External links 
 
 
 
 FCC History Cards for KGBA-FM

Moody Radio affiliate stations
GBA-FM